Kornelia Kunisch ( Elbe, born 17 October 1959 in Lübben (Spreewald)) is a former East German handball player who competed in the 1980 Summer Olympics.

References

External links
profile

1959 births
Living people
People from Lübben (Spreewald)
People from Bezirk Cottbus
German female handball players
Sportspeople from Brandenburg
Olympic handball players of East Germany
Handball players at the 1980 Summer Olympics
Olympic bronze medalists for East Germany
Olympic medalists in handball
Medalists at the 1980 Summer Olympics
Recipients of the Patriotic Order of Merit in silver
20th-century German women